George Nichols or Nicholls may refer to:

Artists
George Nichols (actor and director) (1864–1927), American actor and director
George Nicholls Jr. (1897–1939), American director and editor

Politicians
George Nichols (Australian politician) (1809–1857), New South Wales politician
George Nicholls (British politician) (1864–1943), British Member of Parliament for North Northamptonshire, 1906–1910
George Nichols (American politician) (1827–1907), Vermont physician, politician, and educator
George Nicolls (also spelled Nicholls; c.1884–1942), Sinn Féin politician in the Irish revolutionary period

Sports
George Nichols (cricketer) (1862–1911), Gloucestershire and Somerset first-class cricketer
George Nichols (boxer) (1907–1986), light heavyweight boxer
George Nicholls (rugby league) (born 1944), English rugby league footballer
George Nicholls (footballer) (b. 1890), English footballer, played for Chelsea, Southend Utd, Ton Pentre, Rochdale, Leyton and Walthamstow Grange

Others
George Nichols (martyr) (c. 1550–1589), English Catholic martyr
George Nicholls (commissioner) (1781–1865), British Poor Law Commissioner 
George Elwood Nichols (1882–1939), American botanist
George Ward Nichols (1831–1885), American journalist

See also
George Nicol (disambiguation)